Krulak is a surname. Notable people with the surname include:

Charles C. Krulak (born 1942), 31st Commandant of the Marine Corps, 1995–1999
Victor H. Krulak (1913–2008), decorated United States Marine Corps officer

See also
Krulak Mendenhall mission, fact-finding expedition dispatched by the Kennedy administration to South Vietnam in early September 1963
Kruklanki
Krul
Kulak